Stångenäs AIS is a Swedish football and multisports club located in Brastad.

Background 
Stångenäs AIS currently plays in Division 4 Bohuslän/Dalsland which is the sixth tier of Swedish football. They play their home matches at the Husqvarna Arena in Brastad.

The club is affiliated to Bohusläns Fotbollförbund. Stångenäs AIS have competed in the Svenska Cupen on 5 occasions and have played 8 matches in the competition. The club played in the 2011 Svenska Cupen and beat Gunnilse IS 4–2 at home in the preliminary round but lost 0–1 at home to Örgryte IS in the first round before a crowd of 450 people.

Season to season 
In recent seasons Stångenäs AIS have competed in the following divisions:

Footnotes

External links 
 Stångenäs AIS – Official website
 Stångenäs AIS on Facebook

Football clubs in Västra Götaland County
Association football clubs established in 1946
1946 establishments in Sweden